The Dominican Republic competed at the 1972 Summer Olympics in Munich, West Germany. Five competitors, all men, took part in four events in three sports.

Judo

63 kg:
 Juan Chalas — Round of 32 (→ Did not advance)
80 kg:
 Carlos Socias — Round of 32 (→ Did not advance)

Shooting

Two male shooters represented the Dominican Republic in 1972.

Skeet
 Riad Yunes
 Domingo Lorenzo

Weightlifting

References

External links
Official Olympic Reports

Nations at the 1972 Summer Olympics
1972
1972 in Dominican Republic sport